Thinking XXX is a 2004 documentary television film about the process photographer Timothy Greenfield-Sanders went through to create his book XXX: 30 Porn Star Portraits.

Content 
The film shows Greenfield-Sanders as he shoots portraits of thirty porn stars both clothed and naked for the book as well as presenting conversations and interviews with the performers along with authors, artists and filmmakers outside of the pornography industry. For the portraits Greenfield-Sanders uses an antique view camera as both a challenge to his photographic skills and to have negatives large enough to create oversized exhibition prints for gallery exhibitions.

The film was produced for broadcast on the HBO cable TV channel and was never released to theaters, and was therefore not rated by the Motion Picture Association of America.

List of portrait subjects

 Sunrise Adams 
 Briana Banks
 Belladonna
 Seymore Butts
 Christy Canyon
 Chloe
 Nina Hartley
 Heather Hunter
 Jenna Jameson 
 Jesse Jane
 Ron Jeremy
Jeremy Jordan
 Reina Leone
 Michael Lucas
 Gina Lynn
 Ginger Lynn
 Sean Michaels
 Sharon Mitchell
 Peter North
 Tera Patrick
 Mari Possa
 Lukas Ridgeston
 Savanna Samson
 Aiden Shaw
 Lexington Steele
 May Ling Su

Soundtrack
Track listing:

AA XXX - Peaches
Hot In Here - Tiga
Muscle Car (Reform Reprise) - Mylo
Coochie Coo - Felix da Housecat with Princess Superstar
Train - Goldfrapp
I Want To Be Your Dog - Futon
Lovesucker - Xlover
Sugar - Ladytron
Leave Them All Behind - Whitey
Rock And Roll (Part 3) - Virgin Tears
Freak Like Me - Heather Hunter with DJ Premier
Time Bomb - Rabbit in the Moon  
HLM - Moderato
Here She Comes - Velvet Underground

References

External links
 Official website
 

2004 television films
2004 films
Documentary films about American pornography
Documentary films about photographers
HBO documentary films
2004 documentary films
Films directed by Timothy Greenfield-Sanders
2000s American films
American documentary television films